Robin Guthrie (born 4 January 1962 in Grangemouth, Stirlingshire, Scotland) is a musician best known as co-founder of the Cocteau Twins. This article contains information related to his recordings and his work as a producer and engineer.

Studio albums

Compilation albums

EPs

Singles

Soundtracks

With Violet Indiana

Violet Indiana is a collaboration between Robin Guthrie and Siobhan de Maré (formerly of Mono).

Collaborative albums

Guest appearances

Production

Remixes

References

External links

 
 
 Robin Guthrie's official website, discography

Discography
Discographies of British artists
Electronic music discographies